The Melongenidae, the crown conchs and their relatives, are a taxonomic family of large to very large marine gastropods in the superfamily Buccinoidea.

Taxonomy 
For a while prior to 2004, the genera Busycon and Busycotypus were placed in the Melongenidae. Then, in 2004, based on their digestive systems and on cladistic analysis by Kosyan & Kantor (2004), these two genera were moved to the family Busyconidae within the superfamily Buccinoidea.

According to the taxonomy of the Gastropoda by Bouchet & Rocroi (2005), the Melongenidae consists of two subfamilies:
 Subfamily Melongeninae Gill, 1871 (1854) - synonyms: Cassidulidae Gray, 1854 (inv.); Galeodidae Thiele, 1925 (inv.); Volemidae Winckworth, 1945; Heligmotomidae Adegoke, 1977
 Subfamily Echinofulgurinae Petuch, 1994

Genera
Genera in the family Melongenidae include:
 Brunneifusus Dekkers, 2018
 Hemifusus Swainson, 1840
 Lenifusus Dekkers, 2018
 Melongena Schumacher, 1817 - crown conchs
 Pugilina Schumacher, 1817
 Saginafusus Wenz, 1943
 † Sycostoma Cox, 1931 
 Taphon H. Adams & A. Adams, 1853
 Volegalea Iredale, 1938 
 Volema Röding, 1798 
 Genera brought into synonymy
 Cassidulus Gray, 1854: synonym of Pugilina Schumacher, 1817
 Galeodes Röding, 1798 : synonym of  Melongena Schumacher, 1817
 Semifusus Agassiz, 1846  synonym of Hemifusus Swainson, 1840
 Thalessa H. Adams & A. Adams, 1853: synonym of Volema Röding, 1798

References